Pakenham Secondary College is situated approximately 50 kilometres southeast of Melbourne, Australia. Established in 1968 to provide education to a largely rural community, the school now enrols over 750 students from an urban community. It is currently undergoing a six-stage development project, which has seen the building of a new $3.5 million VCE student complex. The school population is expected to peak at 1800.

Academics
In 2003, 11,  third year students at the school won awards in the Southern Adult Mental Health Service's "Mental Health Awareness Competition".

Rock Eisteddfod Challenge

The college has entered the Rock Eisteddfod Challenge every year since 2005 (except for 2008). In 2005, the college performed a piece entitled 'Evolution', which depicted the evolution of computer games such as Pacman, Frogger, Mario Bros and Lara Croft: Tomb Raider. The college took out awards for Concept and Costuming: Character, however they did not qualify for the 2005 Open Division grand final.

In 2006, the college did a piece called 'Gaia', which was based around Gaia, who is a mother earth figure, and the four elements - air, fire, water and earth are battling for supremacy, in which it is slowly killing Gaia, so the four elements must learn to work together to make the environment a better place. In the heats they were awarded awards for Choreography, Stage Use, Performance Skill, Concept, Drama, Soundtrack, Set Design and Function, Costuming: Character, Visual Enhancement and Student Achievement. The college progressed into the grand final and took out 2nd place including awards for Stage Use, Performance Skill, Concept, Set Design and Function and Entertainment.

In 2007, the college was entered into the premier division for the first time with a show entitled Living Memory, a story based loosely on Seamous Heaney's poem 'The Lady in the Bog'. It involved a group of school children on an excursion, and they are taken back in time to early Irish times, where the druids reign and the town is ruled by them. Each year they celebrate life by having a sacrifice, so it was a stage-by-stage process. The final 20 are represented in the colour red and fire was used as a metaphor as it represented all the sex that would occur during the process. The next scene was a blue scene, which represented the vulnerability of the final 12 chosen, and then they choose the final girl and the rest of the village celebrates. In the heats, they were awarded awards for Choreography, Stage Use, Performance Skill, Concept, Set Design and Function, Costuming: Character and Visual Enhancement, and progressed into the premier grand final, taking out the award for Drug Awareness, and did not place.

In 2009, the college performed a show called 'The Legend of Taiga', which was a journey of two children where their nighttime story becomes reality. Their bedroom turns into a forest and the Leshiyes, deemed kings of Taiga, transport them on a journey through the land of forests, the lake and animals. They hear a sudden lullaby and they return home, but all the creatures don't want them to leave so they all follow the children home, but their Mum catches them all in the kids bedroom. The college had the youngest team in the Victorian Rock Eisteddfod premier division, with approximately 75% of participants in years 7, 8, and 9. We also had a brand new teaching staff, and for the first time, the show was almost entirely driven by the students. In the heats, they were awarded awards for Choreography, Stage Use and Performance Skill, and progressed into the premier division grand final, but did not gain any awards or a place.

In 2010, the college considered entering a RAW division team with a limited amount of student participation and higher amount of teacher support, however this is not confirmed.

Athletics
In 2003, the boys' netball team and girls' football team were named state champions. The boys' netball team succeeded in beating 95 other schools in the State of Victoria to defeat Wheelers Hill in the final.  The girls' football overcame 135 competing schools to defeat Essendon-Keilor Secondary College team in the finals of that year.

In 2005, the College scored second place in the Victorian Interschool Equestrian Challenge.

State investments
The Victoria State Government has made the following investments in the school:
 Modernisation - Redevelopment to L/T standards/library, PE. Project cost of $2,003,000 approved in 2001/2002
 Computer POD - Project cost of $82,404 approved in 2001/2002
 Modernisation - Music Drama, Information Technology. Project cost of $423,827 approved in 2002/2003
 Flexible Learning Centre (refurbishment) for Year 7, including substantial ICT facilities. Project cost of $500,000 (part of the Leading Schools Fund announced in 2003/2004)
 Modernisation - Stage 3 - Lecture Theatre, Modern Home Economics kitchens, General purpose classrooms with open learning spaces, Student Toilets, Year 12 common room. Project cost of $4,450,000 (federal contribution of $1,600,000) approved in 2005/2006
 Modernisation - Stage 4 of 6 redevelopment - Arts, Science and Technology Studies, General purpose classrooms, Staff administration and Student Toilets. Project cost of $6,680,000 approved in 2006/2007

Houses

`Henty (Blue)
Patterson (Gold)
Lecky (Green)
Jamieson (Red)

See also
 List of schools in Victoria
 Victorian Certificate of Education

References

External links
 Official site

Secondary schools in Melbourne
Educational institutions established in 1968
Buildings and structures in the Shire of Cardinia
1968 establishments in Australia